The North of Tyne Combined Authority is a mayoral combined authority which consists the local authorities of Newcastle upon Tyne, North Tyneside, and Northumberland, all in North East England. The authority came into being on 2 November 2018 under the statutory name Newcastle upon Tyne, North Tyneside and Northumberland Combined Authority. The three local authorities previously formed part of the North East Combined Authority, which still exists in a smaller form. The two combined authorities cooperate on the North East Joint Transport Committee.

The authority met for the first time on 8 November 2018 at Morpeth Town Hall. Norma Redfearn, the elected mayor of North Tyneside Council, was appointed the chair until an interim mayor was appointed. At the combined authority cabinet meeting held on 4 December 2018, Norma Redfearn was confirmed as the interim mayor, and remained in post until the election of Labour and Co-operative's Jamie Driscoll as the authority's first directly elected mayor.

In its levelling up white paper, published in February 2022, the UK government announced its intention expand the existing North of Tyne MCA to include the local authorities of Gateshead, South Tyneside and Sunderland.

History 
The authority was formed on 2 November 2018 and in May 2019, elections were held for a directly elected regional mayor who has taken control of certain powers and funding devolved from Westminster to the newly formed region. A fund of £600 million over 30 years, to be administered by the new mayor, was announced in the November 2017 budget.

The responsibilities and governance of the three constituent local authorities will remain unchanged.

Despite the name "North of Tyne," parts of the area are south of the River Tyne, including the towns of Hexham and Prudhoe.

On 27 April 2018, Northumberland, North Tyneside and Newcastle City Council voted to support the proposal. In November 2018 parliament approved the proposal and the first election for the combined authority took place on 2 May 2019 along with the other elections across the United Kingdom.

The 2020 Spring Budget from central government reserves funding for "intra-city transport" between Tees Valley and Tyne and Wear, which has been interpreted by some as meaning the borders of the North of Tyne Combined Authority could be adjusted.

Following the publication of the Levelling Up White Paper in February 2022, it was announced that the North of Tyne is proposed to be enlarged, with Gateshead, South Tyneside and Sunderland joining. County Durham is currently in pursuit of an independent devolution plan. The enlargement would come with an expansion of powers including those for transport, and incorporating the police and crime commissioner role for Northumbria Police, inline with other mayoral combined authorities. It is a high probability the next election will take place during the 2024 United Kingdom local elections.

Membership 
Formal membership of the North of Tyne Combined Authority consists of those serving on the following statutory committees:

 Cabinet
 Overview and Scrutiny Committee
 Audit and Standards Committee

Local Government 

The Combined Authority consists of the following authorities ( population estimates):

References

External links

Combined authorities
Local government in North East England
Local government in Tyne and Wear
Local government in Northumberland